In the provinces of Estonia and Livonia  of the Russian Empire, the title of the senior official was (Provincial) Marshal of Nobility during 1783-1796, when regency for the provinces of Estonia and Livonia was introduced. Subsequently, Russian emperor Paul I  restored the previous administrative organization for Estonia and Livonia.

Provincial Marshals of Nobility of Estonia (1783–1796) 

1783–1786 Moritz Engelbrecht von Kursell (1744–1799) (:de:Moritz Engelbrecht von Kursell)
1786–1789 Johann von Brevern (1749–1803) (:et:Johann von Brevern)
1789–1792 Hermann Ludwig von Löwenstern (1749–1815) (:de:Hermann Ludwig von Löwenstern (Adelsmarschall))
1792–1795 Jakob Johann von Patkul (1757–1811) (:de:Johann Jakob von Patkul)
1795–1796 Alexander Philipp von Saltza (1757–1821) (:et:Alexander Philipp von Saltza)

Provincial Marshals of Nobility of Livonia (1783–1797) 

1783–1786  (1727–1796)
1786–1792  (1747–1820)
1792–1797  (1748–1823)
1797  (1755–1826)

See also
Estonian Knighthood
Livonian Knighthood

References

18th century in Estonia
Estonia history-related lists

et:Aadlimarssal